Hoy Quiero Soñar (Today I Want to Dream) is the ninth studio album recorded by Mexican singer-songwriter Cristian Castro, It was released by Sony BMG Latin on November 23, 2004 (see 2004 in music). It is the last album under the BMG record label. The album was produced by Rudy Pérez, Kike Santander, Daniel Betancourt and Milton Salcedo.

Track listing

Personnel

Juan E. Aristizabal – Engineer
Levi Mora Arriaga – Trumpet
José Luis Arroyave – Engineer
Andrés Bermúdez – Engineer, Mix Engineer
Daniel Betancourt – Arranger, composer, Keyboards, Piano, producer, Programming
Richard Bravo – Percussion
Cristian Castro – Composer
Gustavo Celis – Mix Engineer
Mike Couzzi – Engineer
Vicky Echeverri – Background Vocals
Rafael Ferro García – Arranger, String Conductor
Jose Luis Galvis – Engineer
Julio Hernández – Electric Bass
John Kricker – Trombone
Christian Leuzzi – Composer
Lee Levin – Drums
Gary Lindsay – Arranger, String Conductor
Roberto Livi – Composer
David Jimenez López – Assistant Engineer
Manny López – Guitar
Patrick Magee – Engineer
Miami Symphonic Strings – Strings
Boris Milan – Mix Engineer
Sergio Minski – Production Coordination
José Antonio Molina – Arranger
Ricardo Montaner – Vocals
Teddy Mulet – Trumpet
Joel Numa – Engineer
Alfredo Oliva – Concertmaster
Wendy Pederson – Background Vocals
Jerry Peel – Horn
Betsy Pérez – Production Coordination
Rudy Pérez – Audio Production, composer, engineer, Guitar (Acoustic), Keyboards, Percussion, producer
Clay Perry – Keyboards, Programming
Catalina Rodríguez – Background Vocals
Milton Salcedo – Arranger, Keyboards, Piano, producer, Programming
Kike Santander – Arranger, Audio Production, composer, Background Vocals, Executive Producer, producer
Fernando Tobón – Electric Bass, Drums
Eugenio Vanderhorst – Copyist
Juan José Virviescas – Engineer
Dan Warner – Guitar
Larry Warrilow – Copyist
Bruce Weeden	– Engineer, Mastering, Mezcla

Charts

References

2004 albums
Cristian Castro albums
Spanish-language albums
Sony BMG Norte albums
Albums produced by Rudy Pérez
Albums produced by Kike Santander